Suomi-Finland is the sixth studio album of the Finnish rock band Sielun Veljet. It was released in 1988 between two English language albums, Shit-Hot and Softwood Music Under Slow Pillars. Suomi-Finland has a more acoustic sound than earlier Sielun Veljet material, anticipating the psychedelic, all-acoustic Softwood Music Under Slow Pillars.

"Volvot ulvoo kuun savuun" has been covered by industrial metal band Turmion Kätilöt.

Track listing 
Music and lyrics by Ismo Alanko except where noted.
 "Intro"—0:35
 "Lainsuojaton" (Alanko, Orma) -- 3:10
 "Suomi-Finland" (Alanko, Orma) -- 3:40
 "Huuhaa puuhaa" (Sielun Veljet) -- 3:25
 "Rock'n'Roll"—3:40
 "Ihminen" (Alanko, Orma) -- 5:31
 "Totuus vai tequila"—3:35
 "Sumuista hymyä"—5:30
 "Alamäkeen" (Sielun Veljet) -- 4:23
 "Kaisa ja Ben"—3:54
 "Volvot ulvoo kuun savuun" (Sielun Veljet) -- 3:29

Personnel 
 Ismo Alanko -- vocals, guitar
 Jukka Orma—guitar, strings, keyboards, vocals
 Jouko Hohko -- bass, vocals
 Alf Forsman -- drums, percussion

Notes 

1988 albums
Sielun Veljet albums